Jim Mertens is a former American Football wide receiver who was drafted in 1969 by the American Football League's Miami Dolphins, and was also drafted by the Cincinnati Reds in the 1969 Major League Baseball Draft. Mertens played one season as a Tight End for the Dolphins. He later became a high school teacher in the Hollywood, Florida area.

Early life
He was born James Frederick Mertens in Cumberland, Maryland, United States, in 1947.

Football
Before being drafted by the Miami Dolphins in 1969, Jim attended college in West Virginia, where he was Fairmont State University's 1968 Football Team lead scorer, with 29 receptions for 509 yards and 54 points. He was a letterman for four years and a leading pass receiver on the School's NAIA Bowl Team.

Baseball
Mertens was a leading hitter on Fairmont State's College Baseball Team.

References

1947 births
Living people
American football wide receivers
Fairmont State University alumni
Miami Dolphins players
Sportspeople from Cumberland, Maryland